Kletsky (masculine), Kletskaya (feminine), or Kletskoye (neuter) is the name of several rural localities in Volgograd Oblast, Russia:
Kletsky (rural locality), a khutor in Kletsky Selsoviet of Sredneakhtubinsky District
Kletskaya, a stanitsa in Kletsky Selsoviet of Kletsky District